Marta Alexandra Fartura Braga Temido de Almeida Simões (born 2 March 1974) is a Portuguese politician who served as Minister of Health under Prime Minister António Costa, between 15 October 2018 and 10 September 2022. She has submitted her resignation from the post on 30 August 2022 and ended her functions on 10 September 2022.

Initially she was an Independent minister, invited to perform the role without affiliation to the governing parties, but in August 2021 she joined the Socialist Party (PS).

Early life and education
Temido has a law degree and a master's degree in health economics and management from the University of Coimbra, as well as a PhD in international health from the NOVA University of Lisbon.

Career
Before taking on government duties, Temido was deputy director of the Instituto de Higiene e Medicina Tropical at NOVA University of Lisbon, non-executive chairman of the administration of the Hospital da Cruz Vermelha Portuguesa (Portuguese Red Cross) and a member of the administration of several public hospitals. From 2016 to 2017, Temido served as the president of the board of directors of the Central Administration of the Health System (ACSS).

Temido became well-known in Portugal during the COVID-19 pandemic, appearing almost daily at press conferences. When Portugal held the rotating presidency of the Council of the European Union in 2021, Temido chaired the meetings of its Employment, Social Policy, Health and Consumer Affairs Council, in which she stressed the need for the EU to make joint purchases of vaccines.

References

1974 births
Living people
Portuguese politicians
Health ministers of Portugal
Women government ministers of Portugal
People from Coimbra
Independent politicians in Portugal
21st-century Portuguese women politicians
21st-century Portuguese politicians
University of Coimbra alumni
NOVA University Lisbon alumni